Bowens is a surname of Welsh origin, it is a alteration of Bowen with English patronymic-s. Modified spelling of Dutch Bouwens, an alteration of Bauwens.

 David Bowens (born 1977), American football player
 Tom Bowens (born 1940), American basketball player

See also
 Ab Owen
 Ab Owain
 Bowen (surname)
 Bown
 Bowne
 Owen (name), given name and surname
 Owens (surname)

References